Nancy Ruth Mace (born December 4, 1977) is an American politician serving as the U.S. representative for South Carolina's 1st congressional district since 2021. Her district includes much of the state's share of the East Coast, from Charleston to Hilton Head Island.

In 1999, Mace was the first woman to graduate from the Corps of Cadets program at The Citadel. From 2018 to 2020, she represented the 99th district in the South Carolina House of Representatives, covering Hanahan, northeast Mount Pleasant, and Daniel Island. Mace is the first Republican woman to be elected to Congress from South Carolina.

Mace worked on Donald Trump's 2016 presidential campaign. In 2021, she voted against impeaching Trump in relation to the January 6 attack on the U.S. Capitol, but nevertheless condemned his words and actions before, during, and after the attack. She also voted to hold Trump aide Steve Bannon in contempt of Congress for defying a subpoena to testify before the House Select Committee investigating the attack.

Early life, education, and career
Mace was born at Fort Bragg, North Carolina, to United States Army officer James Emory Mace and schoolteacher Anne Mace. In 1999 she became the first woman to graduate from The Citadel's Corps of Cadets program, receiving a degree in business administration. Mace wrote In the Company of Men: A Woman at The Citadel (Simon & Schuster, 2001) about that experience.

Mace went on to earn a master's degree in journalism and mass communication from the Henry W. Grady College of Journalism and Mass Communication at the University of Georgia.

In 2008, Mace started a consulting business called The Mace Group.

Early political career
Mace campaigned for the Republican Party nomination for the United States Senate in South Carolina in the 2014 election. During the campaign, she opposed the Affordable Care Act, saying, "We must use any means possible to repeal, defund and ultimately stop Obamacare." Mace received 19,560 votes, or 6.2% of the total votes cast, in the Republican primary as incumbent Lindsey Graham re-won nomination.

Mace worked for Donald Trump's 2016 presidential campaign in South Carolina.

South Carolina House of Representatives

Elections

2017 special 
On September 18, 2017, Mace filed as a Republican to run in a special election for the South Carolina State House District 99 seat being vacated by Jimmy Merrill, who resigned earlier that month after an indictment and plea deal for several ethics violations. She received 49.5% of the vote in the November 14 Republican primary, 13 votes short of winning the nomination outright. She defeated the second-place finisher, Mount Pleasant town councilman Mark Smith, in the November 28 runoff, 63–37%.

Mace defeated Democrat Cindy Boatwright in the January 16, 2018, general election, 2,066 votes to 1,587 (57–43%). She took office on January 23, 2018.

2018 
Mace defeated the Democratic nominee, Mount Pleasant resident Jen Gibson, in the November 6, 2018 general election.

Tenure
In 2019, Mace successfully advocated for the inclusion of exceptions for rape and incest in a bill for a six-week abortion ban that passed the South Carolina state house. In a speech on the state house floor, Mace revealed that she had been raped at age 16. She has said she opposes abortion but does not believe the government has the right to tell a victim of rape or incest they do not have the right to an abortion.

Mace co-sponsored a bill to oppose offshore drilling off South Carolina's coast. She opposed President Donald Trump's plan to offer oil drilling leases off South Carolina beaches.

The Conservation Voters of South Carolina gave Mace a 100% Lifetime rating for her voting record against offshore drilling and seismic testing. The South Carolina Club for Growth gave Mace its 2019 Tax Payer Hero Award.

In May 2020, Governor Henry McMaster signed Mace's prison reform bill, which ends the shackling of pregnant mothers in prison, into law.

U.S. House of Representatives

Elections

2020 

In June 2019, Mace announced that she would seek the Republican nomination for South Carolina's 1st congressional district, centered in Charleston, and at the time represented by Democrat Joe Cunningham. Cunningham had won the seat in 2018 in a surprise victory, winning a district Trump had carried by 13 percentage points two years earlier. Mace faced Mount Pleasant City Councilwoman Kathy Landing and Bikers for Trump founder Chris Cox in the June 9 Republican primary. During her primary campaign, she ran an advertisement stating she would "help President Trump take care of our veterans", and in which Vice President Mike Pence called her "an extraordinary American with an extraordinary lifetime of accomplishments—past, present and future." She won the primary with 57.5% of the vote.

Mace focused her campaign on banning offshore drilling off South Carolina's coast and restoring South Carolina's low country's economy.

In the November general election, Mace defeated Cunningham. She assumed office on January 3, 2021.

2022 

Mace did not vote to impeach President Trump, but she criticized him for his role in the January 6, 2021 attack on the U.S. Capitol. As a consequence, Trump endorsed former South Carolina representative Katie Arrington in the 2022 Republican primary for Mace's congressional seat. Mace defeated Arrington.

In the November general election, Mace defeated her Democratic opponent Annie Andrews by 14 percentage points.

Tenure 
Mace was one of seven Republicans who publicly refused to support their colleagues' efforts to challenge the results of the 2020 presidential election on January 6, 2021. These seven signed a letter that, while giving credence to Trump's allegations of electoral fraud, said Congress did not have the authority to influence the election's outcome. Mace was so concerned by the hostile atmosphere Trump was generating in the District of Columbia that she sent her children home to South Carolina before the congressional vote to accept the Electoral College votes. After the 2021 United States Capitol attack, Mace pleaded with Trump to condemn it. While locked down in her Capitol office she told CBS News' Red & Blue host Elaine Quijano, "I'm begging the president to get off Twitter."

Mace, along with all other Senate and House Republicans, voted against the American Rescue Plan Act of 2021.

On May 18, 2021, Mace joined 61 other House Republicans to vote against the COVID-19 Hate Crimes Act, which condemned acts of hate against Asian-Americans and streamlined data collection and reporting about such occurrences. The bill previously passed the U.S. Senate on a 94–1 vote. Mace said she opposed the bill because it did not address discrimination against Asian-Americans in higher education.

In November 2021 Mace criticized fellow Republican Congresswoman Lauren Boebert for her anti-Muslim comments about Democrat Ilhan Omar.

Committee assignments 

 Committee on Transportation and Infrastructure
 Committee on Oversight and Reform
 Committee on Veterans' Affairs

Political positions 

An October 2021 profile in Politico magazine noted that Mace had worked on Donald Trump's 2016 campaign before disavowing him in the wake of the 2021 United States Capitol attack. She then softened her criticism of Trump before "slowly arcing her political trajectory back toward her post-Jan. 6 image as one of the few House Republicans skeptical of a Donald Trump-ruled GOP."

D.C. statehood
In April 2021, Mace voiced her opposition to a Democratic proposal to grant the District of Columbia statehood. She argued that D.C. was too small to qualify as a state, saying, "D.C. wouldn't even qualify as a singular congressional district."

LGBT rights 
In 2021, The Washington Examiner wrote that Mace "is a supporter of both religious liberty and gay marriage." Later that year, she told The Washington Examiner, "I strongly support LGBTQ rights and equality. No one should be discriminated against." She opposed the Equality Act, instead co-sponsoring a Republican alternative called the Fairness for All Act.

Mace was one of 31 Republicans to vote for the LGBTQ Business Equal Credit Enforcement and Investment Act. 
Mace was the lone Republican to sponsor H.R.5776 - Serving Our LGBTQ Veterans Act, legislation establishing a Center for Lesbian, Gay, Bisexual, Transgender, and Queer (LGBTQ) Veterans within the Department of Veterans Affairs. Among other functions, the center must serve as the department's principal adviser on adoption and implementation of policies and programs affecting veterans who are LGBTQ.

In July 2022, Mace was among 47 Republican Representatives who voted in favor of the Respect for Marriage Act, which protects existing same-sex and interracial marriages under federal law. Mace later stated, “If gay couples want to be as happily or miserably married as straight couples, more power to them. Trust me, I’ve tried it more than once."

Abortion and contraception 
On January 26, 2023, Mace introduced the Standing with Moms Act, which would create a website, life.gov, that would link women to crisis pregnancy centers that urge women to continue pregnancy and do not provide information about alternatives such as abortion.

Mace was one of 26 Republicans to vote for the Equal Access to Contraception for Veterans Act.

In 2021, Mace was among a handful of Republican representatives who did not sign onto an amicus brief to overturn Roe v. Wade.

Mace voted for H.R. 8373 ("The Right to Contraception Act"), a bill designed "to protect a person’s ability to access contraceptives and to engage in contraception, and to protect a health care provider’s ability to provide contraceptives, contraception, and information related to contraception".

Regarding abortion legislation, Mace called on legislators to work on a compromise involving "gestational limits" on abortions, citing the example of European nations, but also exceptions for rape or incest, stating: "In most countries in Europe you're looking at 12 to 15 weeks there. And there are other, you know, exceptions that we should be looking at. We should be ensuring that life of the mother in every instance is protected… which is one of the reasons I was one of eight Republicans just a few weeks ago to vote to ensure that women have access to contraceptives. There are some basic things we could be doing that all of us agree on, the vast majority of people agree on, and aren't fringy on either side of the aisle. But that's not what we're doing right now.” She criticized states enacting abortion bans without exceptions in the wake of the Supreme Court overturning Roe v. Wade.

Marijuana legalization
In 2021, Mace introduced the States Reform Act to remove cannabis from the Controlled Substances Act and regulate it similarly to alcohol. Mace said: "This bill supports veterans, law enforcement, farmers, businesses, those with serious illnesses, and it is good for criminal justice reform. ... The States Reform Act takes special care to keep Americans and their children safe while ending federal interference with state cannabis laws."

Foreign policy
In June 2021, Mace was one of 49 House Republicans to vote to repeal the Authorization for Use of Military Force Against Iraq Resolution of 2002.

During the 2021–2022 Russo-Ukrainian crisis, Mace wrote an article stating her opposition to military intervention in the conflict. She later said she was open to a partial No Fly Zone.

Mace voted for H.R. 7691, the Additional Ukraine Supplemental Appropriations Act, 2022, which would provide $40 billion in emergency aid to the Ukrainian government.

In 2023, Mace was among 47 Republicans to vote in favor of H.Con.Res. 21, which directed President Joe Biden to remove U.S. troops from Syria within 180 days.

Gun rights
After the Robb Elementary School shooting in 2022, Mace called for bipartisan action on gun laws. She said, "If we can't even do the bare minimum, we're never going to keep our kids safe in school. Somewhere in the middle is the truth."

Liz Cheney
Mace opposed the first attempt to remove Liz Cheney as chair of the House Republican Conference, saying, "We should not be silencing voices of dissent. That is one of the reasons we are in this today, is that we have allowed QAnon conspiracy theorists to lead us." In early May, Mace appeared at fundraiser events with Cheney. During the second attempt to remove Cheney as chair, however, Mace voted to remove her.

Defense
In September 2021, Mace was among 135 House Republicans to vote in favor of the National Defense Authorization Act of 2022, which contains a provision that would require women to register for the draft.

Contempt of Congress
On October 21, 2021, Mace was one of nine House Republicans who voted to hold Steve Bannon in contempt of Congress for defying a subpoena to appear before the United States House Select Committee on the January 6 Attack. Explaining her vote, Mace said she was being "consistent" and wants "the power to subpoena" in the event that Republicans regain control of the House of Representatives in 2022.

Race and criminal justice
Mace co-sponsored H.R.7394 ("Women in Criminal Justice Reform Act"), a bill addressing issues that women face under the criminal justice system.

In 2021, Mace was the sole Republican sponsor of H.R.4827 ("Judiciary Accountability Act"), a bill applying to judicial branch employees laws that prohibit discrimination based on race, color, religion, sex (including sexual orientation or gender identity), national origin, age, or disability. It also encouraged representation that better reflects demographics.

Personal life 
Mace resides in Charleston, South Carolina, on Daniel Island. She has two children with her ex-husband Curtis Jackson, whom she divorced in 2019. Mace was previously married to Chris Niemiec. In May 2022, she got engaged to Patrick Bryant.

On June 1, 2021, the Charleston Police Department opened an investigation after Mace's home was vandalized with profanity, three  Anarchy symbols, and graffiti in support of the PRO Act.

Electoral history

See also
Women in the United States House of Representatives

References

External links
 Representative Nancy Mace official U.S. House website
 Nancy Mace for US House campaign website
 
 

|-

 
|-

1977 births
21st-century American women politicians
21st-century American politicians
Businesspeople from Charleston, South Carolina
Candidates in the 2014 United States elections
Female members of the United States House of Representatives
Living people
Republican Party members of the South Carolina House of Representatives
People from Cumberland County, North Carolina
Politicians from Charleston, South Carolina
Republican Party members of the United States House of Representatives from South Carolina
The Citadel, The Military College of South Carolina alumni
University of Georgia alumni
Women state legislators in South Carolina